Australia competed at the 2022 World Games held in Birmingham, United States from 7 to 17 July 2022. Athletes representing Australia won three gold medals, one silver medal and two bronze medals. The country finished in 23rd place in the medal table.

Medallists

Acrobatic gymnastics

Australia competed in acrobatic gymnastics.

Archery

Australia competed in archery.

Beach handball

Australia competed in beach handball.

Bowling

Australia won one gold medal in bowling.

Duathlon

Australia competed in duathlon.

Flying disc

Australia won the silver medal in the flying disc competition.

Karate

Australia competed in karate.

Men

Lacrosse

Australia won the bronze medal in the women's tournament.

Muaythai

Australia won one gold medal in muaythai.

Orienteering

Australia competed in orienteering.

Parkour

Australia competed in parkour.

Rhythmic gymnastics

Australia competed in rhythmic gymnastics.

Softball

Australia finished in 4th place in the softball tournament.

Sport climbing

Australia competed in sport climbing.

Squash

Australia competed in squash.

Trampoline gymnastics

Australia won one bronze medal in trampoline gymnastics.

Water skiing

Australia won one gold medal in water skiing / wakeboarding.

References

Nations at the 2022 World Games
2022
World Games